The Semarang metropolitan area, known locally as Kedungsepur (an acronym of Kendal-Demak-Ungaran-Salatiga-Semarang-Purwodadi), is a metropolitan area anchored by the city of Semarang in Central Java, Indonesia. It additionally includes the city of Salatiga, as well as Demak Regency, Grobogan Regency (part only), Kendal Regency, and Semarang Regency. It is the fourth most populous metropolitan area in Indonesia with an estimated population of 5.94 million as of 2015.

Delineation

Transportation 
Semarang is served by Trans Semarang bus rapid transit, comprising at least eight main corridors. Another bus rapid transit, the provincial-owned Trans Jateng has two corridors southward and westward in Semarang metropolitan area, linking Semarang Tawang Station (Semarang) to Bawen Bus Terminal (Semarang Regency) and Mangkang Bus Terminal (Semarang) to Bahurekso Bus Terminal (Kendal Regency).

The eastern part of Semarang metropolitan area is served by Kedungsepur commuter rail.

Notes

References

Metropolitan areas of Indonesia
Central Java
Semarang